Peter Chrappan (born 21 December 1984) is a retired Slovak footballer who last played as a defender for Fola Esch in the Luxembourg National Division.

Career
Starting his career at the youth teams of Inter Bratislava, he moved to Austria in 2006 to play with FC Stadlau, a club in the Austrian fourth tier league, and combining his football career with his studies there. He was transferred to Austrian Bundesliga side SV Mattersburg in 2009 after showing good performances with FC Stadlau. He played with the Mattersburg reserve team before making his debut for the first team in 2010.

Chrappan then moved to Azerbaijan in 2011 and joined Inter Baku. After only one season, he returned to Slovakia to play for Banská Bystrica.

In early 2013, Chrappan joined Malaysia Super League team Selangor FA for a six-month contract. He initially registered only to play for Selangor in AFC Cup competition as quota for non-local players in Malaysia Super League has already been filled. After Ramez Dayoub was suspended from football for life for match fixing charges, Chrappan was quickly registered by Selangor to play in Malaysia Super League and other local competition to replace Ramez. With the switch, Chrappan wears Ramez' number 5 in all local competition, in addition to number 14 he was registered in AFC competitions. His debut for Selangor in the league came in a goalless draw with PBDKT T-Team FC on 5 March 2013.

After the end of his contract with Selangor in June 2013, Chrappan returned to Slovakia to play for FC ViOn Zlaté Moravce in July 2013. A year later he signed for 1. FC Saarbrücken, before signing for Fola Esch in June 2017.

References

External links

MSG Agency profile

1984 births
Living people
Slovak footballers
Association football defenders
FK Inter Bratislava players
SV Mattersburg players
Shamakhi FK players
FK Dukla Banská Bystrica players
Selangor FA players
1. FC Saarbrücken players
Footballers from Bratislava
Expatriate footballers in Austria
Expatriate footballers in Azerbaijan
Slovak expatriate sportspeople in Austria
Slovak expatriate footballers
Austrian Football Bundesliga players
Regionalliga players